Haleyville may refer to:
Haleyville, Alabama
Haleyville City Schools
Haleyville, New Jersey